Gustov or Hustov is a Russian masculine surname, its feminine counterpart is Gustova. It may refer to
Vadim Gustov (born 1948), Russian politician
Vladimir Gustov (born 1961), Russian guitarist, arranger, composer and sound producer
Volodymir Hustov (born 1977), Ukrainian cyclist

See also
Gustov C. Lerch House in Iowa, United States

Russian-language surnames